The trobar leu, or light style of poetry, was the most popular style used by the troubadours. Its accessibility gave it a wide audience.

See also
Trobar ric
Trobar clus

Occitan literature
Western medieval lyric forms